The Federation of the Socialist Workers of France (FTSF) was France's first socialist party, being founded in 1879.

The party was characterised as possibilist because it promoted gradual reforms.

Formation 
After the failure of the Paris commune (1871), French socialism was beheaded as its leaders were dead or exiled. During the Marseille Congress (1879), workers' associations created the Federation of the Socialist Workers' Party of France (Fédération du parti des travailleurs socialistes de France), but in 1882 Jules Guesde and Paul Lafargue (the son-in-law of Karl Marx) left the federation which they considered too moderate and founded the French Workers' Party (Parti ouvrier français, POF). The Federation, initially renamed the Revolutionary Socialist Labour Party (Parti ouvrier socialiste révolutionnaire), and then commonly the Federation of the Socialist Workers of France (Fédération des travailleurs socialistes de France, FTSF), led by Paul Brousse was defined as possibilist because it advocated gradual reforms whereas the POF promoted Marxism. At the same time, Édouard Vaillant and the heirs of Louis Auguste Blanqui founded the Central Revolutionary Committee (Comité révolutionnaire central, CRC), which represented the French revolutionary tradition.

Electoralism and split 
In the 1880s, the socialists knew their first electoral success, conquering some municipalities. Jean Allemane and some FTSF members criticized the focus on electoral goals. In 1890, they split and created the Revolutionary Socialist Workers' Party (Parti ouvrier socialiste révolutionnaire, POSR), which advocated the revolutionary general strike. Additionally, some deputies identified as socialists without being members of any party. These mostly advocated moderation and reform.

End of the FTSF 
While the Dreyfus Affair divided the country in the 1890s, socialist organizations debated whether to ally with other left-wing forces in defense of Alfred Dreyfus and against nationalism and clericalism. Contrary to Jean Jaurès, Jules Guesde thought the socialists should not ally with groups supporting bourgeois democracy. In 1899, a debate raged among socialist groups about the participation of Alexandre Millerand in Pierre Waldeck-Rousseau's cabinet, which included the Marquis de Gallifet, best known for having directed the bloody repression during the Paris Commune. In 1902, the FTSF, the POSR and Jaurès's followers merged into the French Socialist Party. This one merged three years later with the Socialist Party of France of Guesde in the French Section of the Workers' International.

See also 
 French Section of the Workers' International
 French Socialist Party
 History of communism
 History of socialism
 History of the Left in France

References 

Defunct political parties in France
Political parties of the French Third Republic
History of socialism
Socialist parties in France
Second International
Political parties established in 1879
Political parties disestablished in 1902